Beihu may refer to the following locations in China:

 Beihu District (北湖区), Chenzhou City, Hunan
 Beihu Subdistrict, Jianghan District (北湖街道), Wuhan, Hubei
 Beihu Subdistrict, Nanning (北湖街道), in Xixiangtang District, Nanning, Guangxi
 Beihu Subdistrict, Nangong (北胡街道), Hebei
 Beihu Subdistrict, Chenzhou (北胡街道), Beihu District, Chenzhou City, Hunan